Eduard Ohlinger (20 May 1967 – 12 December 2004) was a German weightlifter. He competed in the men's heavyweight II event at the 1988 Summer Olympics.

References

External links
 

1967 births
2004 deaths
German male weightlifters
Olympic weightlifters of West Germany
Weightlifters at the 1988 Summer Olympics
People from Bad Dürkheim (district)
Sportspeople from Rhineland-Palatinate